The American Hobo is a 2003 documentary film by writer and director Bobb Hopkins.

Content 
The documentary examines the history and culture of American hobos. The documentary is narrated by Academy Award-winning actor Ernest Borgnine. It features interviews with Pulitzer Prize-winning author James Michener and musician Merle Haggard.

The film received an honorable mention at the 2003 George Lindsey/UNA Film Festival.

References

External links

2003 films
Documentary films about homelessness in the United States
2003 documentary films
American documentary films
2000s English-language films
2000s American films